Karamkhani may refer to:
 Karamkhani, Gilan
 Karamkhani, Kermanshah